Gateforth is a small village and civil parish located in North Yorkshire, England. According to the 2011 UK census, the village had a population of 240 with 94 households. The village was historically part of the West Riding of Yorkshire until 1974.

Notable buildings

Gateforth Hall was built in 1812 by influential local landowner Sir Humphrey Brooke Osbaldeston – at one time sheriff of York – and used as a meet for Bramham Moor Hunt. Subsequently it was used as a hospital for tuberculosis patients and later a restaurant. As of 2013, it was for sale as a house. It is a Grade II* listed building.
Other notable listed buildings on the former Gateforth Hall estate include a ha-ha (landscape feature) in the grounds and the coach house.
The 71 par course was established as a club in 1907.

References

External links
Gateforth Parish Council

Villages in North Yorkshire
Civil parishes in North Yorkshire
Selby District